Modern Day Drifter is the second studio album by American country music artist Dierks Bentley. It was released on May 10, 2005 via Capitol Records Nashville. The album produced three singles on the U.S. Billboard Hot Country Songs chart with the number 3 hit "Lot of Leavin' Left to Do" and the number ones "Come a Little Closer" and "Settle for a Slowdown". The album was certified platinum by the Recording Industry Association of America (RIAA) and has sold over 1.5 million copies in the United States.

Track listing

Chart performance

Weekly charts

Year-end charts

Singles

Certifications

Personnel 
Dierks Bentley – lead vocals
 Steve Brewster – drums
 Jimmy Carter – bass guitar
 J. T. Corenflos – electric guitar, Danelectro
 Aubrey Haynie – fiddle
 Lona Heins – background vocals
 Wes Hightower – background vocals
 Rod Janzen – electric guitar
 Randy Kohrs – Dobro
 Alison Krauss – background vocals
 Gary Morse – Sho-Bud pedal steel guitar, lap steel guitar
 Michelle Poe – background vocals
 Steve Sheehan – acoustic guitar
 Bryan Sutton – acoustic guitar, banjo, mandolin
 Russell Terrell – background vocals

Del McCoury Band (on Track 10) 
 Mike Bub – upright bass
 Jason Carter – fiddle
 Del McCoury – acoustic guitar, background vocals
 Rob McCoury – banjo
 Ronnie McCoury – mandolin, background vocals

References

2005 albums 
Albums produced by Brett Beavers
Capitol Records Nashville albums
Dierks Bentley albums